Lincoln Township is the name of five townships in the U.S. state of Indiana:

 Lincoln Township, Hendricks County, Indiana
 Lincoln Township, LaPorte County, Indiana
 Lincoln Township, Newton County, Indiana
 Lincoln Township, St. Joseph County, Indiana
 Lincoln Township, White County, Indiana

Indiana township disambiguation pages